Primorsk is a rural locality (a settlement) and the administrative center of Primorskoye Rural Settlement, Bykovsky District, Volgograd Oblast, Russia. The population was 3,159 as of 2010. There are 33 streets.

Geography 
Primorsk is located on the left bank of the Volga River, in Zavolzhye, 69 km south of Bykovo (the district's administrative centre) by road. Gornovodyanoye is the nearest rural locality.

References 

Rural localities in Bykovsky District